The 2013 Women's Asian Champions Trophy was the third edition of the Women's Asian Champions Trophy. The tournament was held in  Kakamigahara, Japan. The four Asian teams (China, India, Japan and Malaysia) participated in the tournament which involved round-robin league among all teams followed by play-offs for final positions.

Japan won the tournament for the first time after defeating India 1–0 in the final.

Teams
Below is the list of participating teams for the tournament

Results
All times are Japan Standard Time (UTC+9)

Preliminary round

Classification round

Third-place game

Final

Final standings

See also
2013 Men's Asian Champions Trophy
2013 Women's Hockey Asia Cup

References

Women's Asian Champions Trophy
Asian Champions Trophy
Asian Champions Trophy
International women's field hockey competitions hosted by Japan
Sport in Gifu Prefecture
Kakamigahara, Gifu
Asian Champions Trophy